Tree House is the third mixtape by American rapper and producer Le1f. It was released on Camp & Street on September 18, 2013.

Critical reception

Robert Whitfield of The 405 said, "On Tree House, and Le1f's other releases, he's consistently shown himself to be ahead of the rest of the rap scene musically and lyrically." Sean Delanty of Tiny Mix Tapes called the mixtape "an undeniably impressive statement by an increasingly vital voice in the independent hip-hop world."

Accolades

Track listing

References

External links
 

2013 mixtape albums
Leif (rapper) albums